Vilgot Bengt "Ville" Larsson (3 May 1932 – 21 December 2015) was a Swedish  ice hockey defenceman and Olympian.

Larsson played with Team Sweden at the 1956 Winter Olympics held in Cortina d'Ampezzo, Italy. He also played for Leksands IF. He died in 2015, aged 83.

References

External links

1932 births
2015 deaths
Ice hockey players at the 1956 Winter Olympics
Leksands IF players
Olympic ice hockey players of Sweden
People from Falun
Swedish ice hockey defencemen
Sportspeople from Dalarna County